The Official Bulletin of the Government Junta was the gazette of the Revolutionary Junta of Iquique, formed in opposition to Chilean President José Manuel Balmaceda. It published official documents of the Junta and its state ministries.

Its first issue was published in Iquique on 28 May 1891. Its 5 September 1891 issue was published in Santiago. Its final edition was Number 72, published on 10 November 1891. Its editor was Jorge Huneeus Gana.

The Official Journal of the Republic of Chile continued to be published during this period, but only included documents of the Balmaceda government.

See also
 Chilean Civil War of 1891

References

1891 establishments in Chile
Publications established in 1891
Publications disestablished in 1891
Newspapers published in Chile
Chile
Spanish-language newspapers